Polycanthus is a genus of acoels. It is monospecific, being represented by a single species, Polycanthus torosus.  It lives in a subtidal, sandy bottom habitat in the western South Pacific Ocean.

References

Acoelomorphs